Dukono is an active volcano located in the northern part of Halmahera island, Indonesia. It has a broad profile and is capped by compound craters. During the major eruption in 1550, a lava flow filled in the strait between Halmahera and the north flank cone of Mount Mamuya. It was an eruption of scale 3 on VEI. Deaths were reported but the figure is unknown. Smaller eruptions occurred in 1719, 1868, and 1901. Since 1933, Dukono has been erupting continuously until the present.

Eruptions in 2014 increased since early spring. Ash clouds rose up to  height and volcanic lightning were observed and photographed on June 11. Strombolian eruptions spew lava bombs on the outer flank of the crater cone.

See also 

 List of volcanoes in Indonesia

References

External links 

 Photogallery Dukono

Complex volcanoes
Mountains of Indonesia
Active volcanoes of Indonesia
Volcanoes of Halmahera